Jonathan Scott Sieben, OAM (born 24 August 1966) is an Australian former butterfly swimmer of the 1980s, who won gold in the 200-metre butterfly at the 1984 Summer Olympics in Los Angeles Olympics.

Hailing from Brisbane, Queensland, Sieben was coached by Laurie Lawrence, and made his debut at the young age of 15 at the 1982 Commonwealth Games in Brisbane, where he captured a bronze in the 200-metre butterfly, as well as gold in the medley relay. Sieben and Lawrence continued their preparation for Los Angeles, but were given little chance. Sieben was known to his friends as The Shrimp, as he stood just 173 cm, in contrast to the dominant swimmer of the time, West Germany's Michael Gross, the world record holder, known as The Albatross with his 200 cm frame and 225 cm wingspan. He also faced the 100-metre butterfly world record holder, the United States' Pablo Morales. Sieben swam in the wake of Gross and Morales in the first 150 metres, before storming home in the last 50 metres to claim the gold medal in a world record time of 1 m 57.04 s, more than four seconds faster than he had ever swum before. He also collected a bronze medal after swimming in the preliminaries of the medley relay. He was named the Young Australian of the Year in 1984.

By the 1988 Summer Olympics in Seoul, Sieben's ability had waned, and the selectors did not choose him for the 200 m butterfly. He finished fourth in the 100-metre butterfly. He continued onto the 1992 Summer Olympics in Barcelona, but failed to reach the final of the 100-metre butterfly individual event.  He formed part of Australia's 4x100-metre medley relay team that finished 7th in the final, in a national record time of 3:42.65.

Sieben was inducted into the Sport Australia Hall of Fame in 1985.

In 2020 Jon was involved in the construction of the North Queensland Cowboys' Community, Training and High Performance Centre commissioning the pools for Chris Williams and Hutchinson Builders.

See also
 List of Commonwealth Games medallists in swimming (men)
 List of Olympic medalists in swimming (men)
 World record progression 200 metres butterfly

References

Bibliography
 
 

1966 births
Living people
Australian male butterfly swimmers
Olympic swimmers of Australia
Swimmers from Brisbane
Swimmers at the 1984 Summer Olympics
Swimmers at the 1988 Summer Olympics
Swimmers at the 1992 Summer Olympics
Australian people of German descent
World record setters in swimming
Recipients of the Medal of the Order of Australia
Sport Australia Hall of Fame inductees
Olympic bronze medalists in swimming
People educated at Brisbane State High School
Medalists at the 1984 Summer Olympics
Commonwealth Games gold medallists for Australia
Commonwealth Games bronze medallists for Australia
Olympic gold medalists for Australia
Olympic bronze medalists for Australia
Olympic gold medalists in swimming
Commonwealth Games medallists in swimming
Universiade medalists in swimming
Swimmers at the 1982 Commonwealth Games
Universiade gold medalists for Australia
Medalists at the 1985 Summer Universiade
Medallists at the 1982 Commonwealth Games